Woodlawn Memorial Park Cemetery is located at 660 Thompson Lane in Nashville, Tennessee. It is one of the largest cemeteries in Nashville. Among those interred or entombed in the cemetery, there are many prominent members of the country music genre and their families.

In June 2018, Woodlawn Memorial Park Cemetery installed the "Lynn Anderson Rose Garden", consisting of 200 Lynn Anderson Hybrid Rose Bushes (named for the singer by the National Rose Society of America), as a place of reflection and meditation in honor of the star's signature song.

Notable graves

 Joe Allison (1924–2002), songwriter
 Liz Anderson (1927–2011), country music singer, songwriter, and mother to country musician Lynn Anderson.
 Lynn Anderson (1947–2015), Country music singer
 Eddy Arnold (1918–2008), Country Music Singer, Recording Executive, Producer and Country Music Hall of Fame Member
 Ernie Ashworth (1928–2009), country music singer, Grand Ole Opry member
 Rob Bironas (1978–2014), professional football player/Placekicker for the Tennessee Titans
 Otis Blackwell (1931–2002), Songwriters Hall of Fame member
 H. Leo Boles (1874–1946), president of Lipscomb University.
 Owen Bradley (1915–1998), record producer, Country Music Hall of Fame member, Academy Award nominee
 Jim Ed Brown (1934–2015), Country Music Hall of Fame singer
 Boudleaux Bryant (1920–1987), Country Music Hall of Fame and Songwriters Hall of Fame member
 Felice Bryant (1925–2003), Country Music Hall of Fame and Songwriters Hall of Fame member
 Billy Collins (1963–1984), boxer
 Jerry Chesnut (1931–2018), country music songwriter
 Little Jimmy Dickens (1920–2015), Country Music Hall of Fame singer
 Kerby Farrell (1913–1975), Major League Baseball Player, Manager Boston Braves, Chicago White Sox
 Red Foley (1910–1968), Country Music Hall of Fame singer
 D. J. Fontana (1931–2018), drummer
 Benton Cordell Goodpasture (1895–1977), Churches of Christ minister, editor of the Gospel Advocate
 Dobie Gray (1940–2011), singer and songwriter
 Vernon Holland (1948–1998), Professional football player Cincinnati Bengals, New York Giants and Detroit Lions
 Tommy Jackson (1926–1979), musician – considered by many in the country music industry to be the first great Nashville session fiddler
 George Jones (1931–2013), Country Music Hall of Fame Singer
 Amelia Laskey (1885–1973), ornithologist
 Larrie Londin (1943–1992), drummer
 Neal Matthews, Jr. (1929–2000), decorated soldier, Country Music Hall of Fame singer
 Claudette Frady-Orbison (1941–1966), wife of legendary singer Roy Orbison. She died when her motorcycle was hit by a truck. She is buried with her two young boys, Roy Dewayne Orbison (1958–1968) and Anthony King Orbison (1962–1968), who died together in a house fire
 Joe Moscheo (1937–2016), singer, The Imperials and Elvis backup
 K.T. Oslin (1942–2020) country singer and songwriter
 Johnny Paycheck (1938–2003), country singer
 Ben Peters (1933–2005), Nashville Songwriters Hall of Fame songwriter
 Lynn Peterzell (1955–1994), noted audio engineer
 Webb Pierce (1921–1991), Country Music Hall of Fame singer
 Dottie Rambo (1934–2008), Gospel singer and songwriter. Named songwriter of the century in the early 1990s, Grammy and Dove winner, Gospel Music Hall of Fame for self and family group The Rambos, Nashville Songwriters Hall of Fame, composed over 2,500 songs
 Marty Robbins (1925–1982), Country Music Hall of Fame singer
 Jerry Reed (1937–2008), Country music singer and Actor
 Dan Seals (1948–2009), 1980s country singer, of 1970s pop/rock duo England Dan & John Ford Coley
 Red Sovine (1917–1980), country singer
 Brock Speer (1920–1999), gospel music singer
 Mel Street (1933–1978), country singer
 JD Sumner (1924–1998), singer, Elvis' backup
 Van Stephenson (1953–2001), Country singer, songwriter. He was a member of Blackhawk
 Gordon Stoker (1924–2013), singer The Jordanaires
 Mack Vickery (1938–2004), songwriter, singer, musician, Alabama Music Hall of Fame
 Porter Wagoner (1927–2007), Country Music Hall of Fame singer
 Tammy Wynette (1942–1998), Country Music Hall of Fame singer

References

External links

 

Cemeteries in Nashville, Tennessee